The Three Musketeers is a 1961 film adaptation of the 1844 novel by Alexandre Dumas, père. It was released in two parts within the same year.

Plot summary

Cast
 Gérard Barray as d'Artagnan
 Mylène Demongeot as Milady de Winter
 Perrette Pradier as Constance Bonacieux
 Georges Descrières as Athos
 Bernard Woringer as Porthos
 Jacques Toja as Aramis
 Jean Carmet as Planchet
 Guy Delorme as the Count De Rochefort
 Daniel Sorano as Cardinal Richelieu
 Françoise Christoph as (Queen) Anne of Austria
 Robert Berri as M. Bonacieux
 Henri Nassiet as M. de Tréville
 Guy Tréjan  as (King) Louis XIII
 Jacques Berthier as the Duke of Buckingham

Production 
Filming locations included Bois de Boulogne, Château de Guermantes in Seine-et-Marne and Semur-en-Auxois (department Côte-d'Or).

Reception
"The Three Musketeers" was the sixth most watched movie at the French box office in 1961.

References

External links
 
 

1961 films
French adventure films
Italian adventure films
1960s French-language films
Films directed by Bernard Borderie
Films based on The Three Musketeers
Films shot in France
1961 adventure films
Italian swashbuckler films
French swashbuckler films
Films set in the 1620s
Films set in France
Films set in Paris
Films released in separate parts
Cultural depictions of Cardinal Richelieu
Cultural depictions of Louis XIII
1960s Italian films
1960s French films